The Blanche and Oscar Tryck House is a historic house on North Knik Street (at the northwest corner with the Parks Highway) in Wasilla, Alaska.  Built sometime before 1916 at Knik, it was the first house in Wasilla when the community was established, moved there by the Trycks in 1917.  It is a single-story wood-frame structure, roughly rectangular in shape, with a concrete foundation and a corrugated metal gable roof configured to capture rainwater for laundry and other uses.  It has a brick chimney and a root cellar, and has been vacant since Oscar Tryck died in 1964.

The house was listed on the National Register of Historic Places in 2004.

See also
National Register of Historic Places listings in Matanuska-Susitna Borough, Alaska

References

Houses on the National Register of Historic Places in Alaska
Houses completed in 1917
Houses in Matanuska-Susitna Borough, Alaska
Relocated buildings and structures in Alaska
Unused buildings in Alaska
Wasilla, Alaska
Buildings and structures on the National Register of Historic Places in Matanuska-Susitna Borough, Alaska